The Palestine Research Center (PRC) was an institute established in Beirut in 1965 to gather, conserve and analyse books and materials relating to Palestine, its culture and modern history, and to the political struggles of the Palestinian people. It suffered damage from several attacks before a car bomb placed by an Israel proxy terrorist group, the Front for the Liberation of Lebanon from Foreigners destroyed the building in 1983. It was under diplomatic protection.

History
The Palestine Research Center was established in 1965, just one year after the PLO itself, as both a research and educational institution. The decision to found it was taken on 28 February of that year by the PLO executive committee, and its first director was Fayiz Sayigh. It occupied 6 floors of a 7-storey building on Colombani Street in the residential Hamra district of Western Beirut, and was accorded diplomatic protection by the Lebanese government. The purpose was to gather materials, books, articles and publications bearing on Palestinian history, society culture and politics – both Israeli and Palestinian. It also published a quarterly,  ("Palestinian Affairs")   (The Palestinian Documents) from 1971 onwards. By 1982 it had managed to build a substantial library of some 25,000 volumes in English, Arabic and Hebrew, together with a microfilm collection, forming a repository of Palestinian archives, what the center's director stated was perhaps 'the world's largest collections of manuscripts on the question of Palestine.' Courses in Hebrew were also taught.

At its peak, at least 40 researchers were employed, who produced, mainly in Arabic but also in French and English, over 300 publications. The researchers were supported by a further 40 personnel. Anis Sayigh, a Lebanese Palestinian who had obtained a doctorate from Cambridge University in Middle Eastern Studies in 1964,   replaced his brother Fayiz as director in 1966, a position he held until 1977. He submitted his resignation in 1976, but stayed on to direct the institute for another year until his successor, Sabri Jiryis appointed that year, could relieve him. Jiryis, a Hebrew-speaking Palestinian with a degree in law from Hebrew University, had left Israel in 1970 after being subjected to two successive periods of administrative detention. In the period of transition, the center was run by the Palestinian poet Mahmoud Darwish (1977-1978). At the time its contents were plundered Constantin Zureiq professor emeritus at the American University of Beirut, presided as chairman of institute's board while Dr. Walid Khalidi, a visiting professor at Harvard University, was secretary.

As Israeli troops during the second Israeli invasion of Lebanon prepared to enter Beirut. Jiryis, anticipating the risk of seizure, had the Center's collection of rare and highly valuable documents, and all files pertaining to sensitive information, such as personnel files, packed away in two suitcasesand later shipped out to safety from Lebanon. When the invasion got underway, the PRC was targeted in two earlier car bombings, in July and August 1982. On July 13, a car positioned in a parking lot adjacent to the Center exploded, but caused only minor damage. On 18 August, P.L.O. officers detected another car packed with explosives parked in front, and managed to evacuate people from the vicinity before it exploded and wounded 4 people.

In September it was then occupied by Israeli soldiers for a week, and then was subsequently ransacked: filing cabinets, desks and other furniture were smashed, a strong box was rifled to take its contents, and telephones, heaters, electric fans, a printing press and other fixtures were also stolen. This operation was part of a broader strategy of gathering documents from all PLO offices the IDF raided in Lebanon. On 15 September the contents of its library and microfilm collections were loaded onto three trucks and, carted away, crated and shipped to Israel. One Israeli soldier engaged in trucking away the archive, noticing a blackboard in a room with Hebrew writing on it, left a message by chalking "You're screwed!" on it. Many documents were selectively used by Israel to construct a narrative that cast Palestinians as terrorists and the IDF invasion as one that liberated Lebanon.

A further set of at least 120 films and documentaries was collected in Beirut and confiscated but the 'PLO archives' from which the materials had been looted has not been identified. The collection is now housed in Tel Aviv and is difficult to access. On the departure of the Israelis, and subsequent to the PLO exodus, it became the sole remaining PLO institution in Lebanon. The material lost was estimated at $1.5 million, but most of the manuscripts were irreplaceable. Jiryis accused Israel of 'plunder(ing) our Palestinian cultural heritage.' Jiryis quickly set about reordering books – his file cards for Hebrew publications alone were 10 inches high – in order to rebuild the lost collection.

Research on Zionism and the Pittsburgh Platform
The PLO's Beirut Research center was particularly fascinated by a statement drawn up in 1885 by a group of Reform Judaism rabbis. It ran
"We consider ourselves no longer a nation, but a religious community and therefore expect neither a return to Palestine, nor a sacrificial worship under the sons of Aaron, nor the restoration of any of the laws concerning the Jewish state".

This declaration became known as the Pittsburgh Platform, a formulation later developed by Elmer Berger in his critiques of Zionism.

The words in the Pittsburgh Platform were adopted almost verbatim in the foundational document of the PLO, namely the Palestinian National Covenant. In the Palestinian reading of Jewish tradition, this document was taken as proof that the rabbinical authorities admitted that Jews were not a nation but citizens of the states where they belonged, and thus Judaism itself was a religion, not a project for nation-building or territorial repossession of the Holy Land. By this time however Reform Judaism had officially disavowed the statement because of its implicit anti-Zionism, and had replaced it with the Columbus Platform (1937).

February 1983 car bombing
The impact of the explosion of the 150 kilograms of TNT was huge, rattling windows and shaking buildings throughout West Beirut, while engulfing pedestrians, drivers and shoppers who happened to be in the vicinity when the bomb went off at 2 p.m. The car bomb gutted the entire building housing the Center, killing Jiryis's wife Hanneh Shahin, who had dropped in for a visit just before its weekend closing.  3 people who were caught in its elevator at the time died of asphyxiation from smoke inhalation after being trapped inside. The concierge and a telephone operator were also killed.

Shafiq al-Hout, the PLO diplomatic representative, had a temporary office in the building after the Lebanese Army closed the P.L.O.'s Beirut mission in September. He survived by happening to be home at the time of the explosion.

After the extensive raiding of PLO offices and institutions in 1982 and the confiscating of documents, researchers scoured the sites to retrieve whatever material had been missed and, once collected, the material was deposited on one floor of the building, at the Planning Center office.  All of these files were destroyed in the explosion.

Aftermath
The material taken, according to the director of the Research Center, related to historical information on Arab families and villages in pre-1948 Palestine. Israeli officials argued that the PLC was more an intelligence gathering organization than an academic center, and that the data could be exploited to plan terrorist raids into Israel. As negotiations got underway, the PLO, at Jiryis's insistence that the archive be treated as a prisoner of war, included as a condition for a prisoner exchange with the Israelis, the restitution of the expropriated archives. On 24 November 1983 6 Israeli and 5,000 POWs were exchanged together with what Israel stated was the PLO archive.  Israel had copied the archive, after which it was recrated in 100 boxes and dispatched, under the auspices of the International Red Cross to Algeria. Since Israel had also stolen the PRC's inventory of its holdings, it proved impossible to verify whether the total contents of the center had been handed back or not. Rona Sela, through the offices of Michael Sfard managed in 2008 to obtain a confirmation from the IDF that many of the spoils seized in Beirut at that period still remained in the IDF archives in Tel Aviv.

A month after the exchange, on 19 December, Resolution 38/180B of the 38th United Nations General Assembly, with 121 votes in favour, 1 against, and 20 abstentions, condemned Israel for having seized and removed the archives and documents.

The Algerian military transported the consignment firstly to al-Kharruba, and then to the
Tébessa military base.  The final destination proved to be the El Bayadh base in the Algerian desert close to the border with Tunisia. This third shift was dictated by precautions after the Israeli air force destroyed the PLO's headquarters in Hammam al-Shatt, Tunisia on 1 October 1985. Due to internal squabbles among the PLO leaders, -Arafat wanted it relocated in Cairo, Abu Iyad in Algiers – the boxes were left in this final location and remain to this day, apparently, in Algeria. Whether it has remained intact or not, given poor storage and extremities of rain, heat and rats, is unknown. One report states that it has been destroyed by a combination of these effects, and neglect.
According to Sleiman, the new archive established by the Palestinian National Authority, lacking the reincorporation of the Liberation Movement's archive of the PLO's early days, will memorialize the records of the Palestinian people as those of the nascent state, and not the experience of its earlier revolutionary years.

Jiryis set out to rebuild the collection from the damage sustained. After Israel restored the looted materials, the building was again bombed by Lebanese groups, killing or wounding several staff members, and damaging the structure. Negotiations with states in the area to relocate failed, so the Center subsequently relocated provisorily to Nicosia, Cyprus, pending negotiations with the Egyptian government aiming to receive permission to rebuild the center in Cairo. Jiryis continued to operate the center in Nicosia until his return to his native village of Fassuta in northern Israel in 1992, He endeavoured to re-establish a Research Center in East Jerusalem but those archives too were again confiscated when Israeli police raided and in August 2001 closed down the PLO's headquarters in Orient House, on whose grounds, since 1983, the Arab Studies Society, founded by Faisal al-Husseini to document the Arab history of Palestine, had been housed. Thus Jiryis's attempts to document Palestinian history were subject to two confiscations, in Beirut and, two decades later, in East Jerusalem.

Antoon de Baetz classifies Israel's confiscation or destruction of Palestinian documents as an example of the censorship of historical thought practiced by many nations. The Israeli scholar Rona Sela views these incidents as part of an ongoing policy or practice since the 1930s to appropriate, conceal and thereby exercise control over Palestinian representations of their historical experience. She further argues that there is a double standard in Israeli society regarding heritage: a consensus exists that valued properties seized in WW2 must be returned to their Jewish owners, but this ethical code is not applied to Palestinian treasures which Israel has seized as booty.

Notes

Citations

Sources

Defunct organisations based in Lebanon
Educational institutions established in 1965
Palestinian organizations
Research institutes established in 1965